Cronicombra essedaria is a species of sedge moth in the genus Cronicombra. It was described by Edward Meyrick in 1926. It is found in Peru.

References

External links
 Cronicombra essedaria at ZipcodeZoo.com

Moths described in 1926
Glyphipterigidae